Rovner may refer to:

Places
Rovno, Rivne Oblast, a city in Ukraine

People
Anton Rovner, composer
Ilana Rovner, American judge
Irwin Rovner, archaeologist
Julie Rovner, journalist
Michal Rovner, photographer
Pinkhus Rovner, Bolshevik political figure
Robert Rovner, television producer and writer
Robert A. Rovner, Pennsylvania State Senator